Rozonda Ocielian Thomas (born February 27, 1971), better known by her stage name Chilli, is an American singer, dancer and actress who was a member of the group TLC, one of the best-selling girl groups of the late 20th century.

Early life
Thomas was born in Columbus, Georgia and graduated from Benjamin Elijah Mays High School in 1989. Her father, Abdul Ali, is of Bangladeshi and Arab descent, and her mother, Ava Thomas, is African American. Thomas, who had been raised by her mother, later allowed the Sally Jessy Raphael television talk show to air footage of her meeting her father for the first time in 1996, when she was 25.

When she was a child, her great grandmother, whom she called Big Mama, took her to the Seventh-day Adventist Church.

Music career

1991–present: TLC

Thomas was first a dancer for Damian Dame. In 1991, she joined TLC, replacing founding member Crystal Jones, and was nicknamed "Chilli" by Lisa Lopes so that the group could retain the name TLC. The group went on to sell over 65 million records worldwide and became the best-selling American girl group of all-time; only the Spice Girls has sold more. Chilli has won four Grammy Awards for her work with TLC.

Since the death of group member Lisa "Left Eye" Lopes in April 2002, Thomas and Tionne "T-Boz" Watkins have occasionally performed as a duo. In 2009, Thomas and Watkins performed a series of concerts in Asia.

In late 2011, VH1 announced plans to produce a biopic on TLC to air in 2013. Thomas and Watkins signed on as producers. Actress and singer Keke Palmer portrayed Thomas in CrazySexyCool: The TLC Story.

In 2019, Thomas lost her voice and was ordered by doctors not to sing. TLC then had to cancel their singing for the California State Fair and the Stanislaus State Fair.

Solo career

Thomas began working on her solo album in 2000 after the completion of promotion for TLC's third album, FanMail (1999). She ceased production when work began on the next TLC album, 3D (2002). In 2006, rumors circulated that she had signed a four-album deal with singer/rapper Akon's label Kon Live Distribution. She later denied these reports and confirmed that she was entertaining offers from other record labels. It was confirmed that the name of the album would be titled Bi-Polar, but due to scheduling conflicts and constant delays, the album was shelved. The album was once rumored to include work by Missy Elliott as well as tracks produced by T-Pain and Tricky Stewart. Certain tracks that were intended for the album were leaked from 2006 to 2008. A track titled "Gameproof", which featured her TLC bandmate T-Boz, was leaked in spring 2006. On February 16, 2007, "Straight Jack", a track featuring Missy Elliott and produced by Polow da Don was leaked. The track entered the Deutsche Black Chart in at #35. In early April 2008, Thomas's first official solo single, "Dumb, Dumb, Dumb" was released.

In 2012, Thomas appeared as the leading lady in R&B singer Tyrese's music video for his single "Nothing On You."

In January 2016, she released a new solo single, "Body", which served to promote her new fitness workout campaign.

Acting and television roles
Thomas made guest appearances on television shows such as The Parkers, Single Ladies, That 70s Show, Living Single and Strong Medicine. In 1992, she made a brief cameo in the video for "Jump" by Kriss Kross. In 2000, she was featured in the made-for-television movies A Diva's Christmas Carol and Love Song (with close friend Monica), and in the film Snow Day. In 2001, she co-starred in the action film Ticker, directed by Albert Pyun and House Party 3. She also played a small role in the 1998 film Hav Plenty.  She appeared again on the show's second season performing her unreleased track, "Flirt", written by Tiyon "TC" Mack and produced by Soundz.

In 2005, Thomas and Watkins looked for a new TLC member in the reality series R U The Girl.
In June 2009, VH1 announced the airing of a reality TV series starring Thomas. The series, What Chilli Wants, which documents Thomas's quest to find love and manage her life with the help of love and relationship expert Tionna Tee Smalls, premiered on April 11, 2010. The second season of What Chilli Wants premiered on January 2, 2011. In 2011, Thomas made cameo appearances throughout the first season of VH1's Single Ladies.

In 2013, Thomas became a member of "Team Guy" on the second season of Food Network's Rachael vs. Guy: Celebrity Cook-Off. She appeared naked in a PETA anti-circus ad campaign. Thomas also appeared on episode 14 of WWE Countdown where she spoke about The Rock. Thomas was a judge for truTV's reality series Fake Off which premiered on October 27, 2014.

In 2016, she joined the cast of the film Marshall which is a biopic on the life of Thurgood Marshall; she plays Zora Neale Hurston.

Personal life
At age 20, Thomas became pregnant by producer Dallas Austin; due to career aspirations and outside pressures, she aborted the pregnancy. She later revealed that she regretted the decision. Thomas and Austin continued their relationship, and would later have a son, Tron Austin (born June 2, 1997).

In 2001, Thomas began dating  Usher, after she starred in his music videos for "U Remind Me", "U Got It Bad", and “U Don’t Have to Call”. Their relationship lasted for two years: they broke up in December 2003, followed by a media frenzy surrounding the personal nature of Usher's fourth album, Confessions. His fans inferred the reason he and Thomas split is due to infidelity on his part, given allusions to such in the album's song lyrics. On February 17, 2004, during an interview on The Bert Show on Atlanta radio channel Q100, Thomas claimed that Usher cheated on her: "Usher did the ultimate no-no to me....I will never be with him again, and that is that". Usher defended: "it just didn't work out. But cheating is not what caused the relationship to collide and crash. That ain't what broke it up".

In late 2022, Thomas began dating actor Matthew Lawrence. The pair went public with their relationship in January 2023.

Other ventures 
Thomas and the rest of the members of TLC were big proponents of encouraging safe sex. For the music video of the song, "Ain't 2 Proud 2 Beg" Thomas and other band members wore condoms on their clothing. In 2003, Thomas and Watkins teamed up with Agouron Pharmaceuticals to create a national education program about HIV/AIDS. The program supplied people with information about HIV/AIDS, including prevention and treatment.

In 2012, Thomas started a non-profit organization called Chilli's Crew. The organization is an Atlanta-based program targeted at helping girls between the ages of 13-17 build healthy levels of self-esteem.

In 2013, Thomas took a stand against cyberbullying after her son Tron was a victim. The gossip site MediaTakeOut.com targeted Thomas's son because of his apparel and questioned his sexuality. In response, Thomas created a petition through change.org to get the article deleted from the site and to stop staff members from gossiping about minors entirely. In her petition, she described what cyberbullying is and statistics about some of the victims. The site ended up removing the article and issuing an apology to her son.

Discography

Featured singles
 "Dumb Dumb Dumb" (2008)
 "Gameproof (featuring T-Boz) (2008)
 "Let's Just Do It" (Lisa Lopes featuring Missy Elliott and TLC) (2009)
 "Body" (2016)

Studio albums with TLC
Ooooooohhh... On the TLC Tip (1992)
CrazySexyCool (1994)
FanMail (1999)
3D (2002)
TLC (2017)

Filmography

Film

Television

References

External links
 

1971 births
20th-century African-American women singers
21st-century African-American women singers
African-American actresses
African-American television personalities
African-American women singers
American contemporary R&B singers
American film actresses
American mezzo-sopranos
American people of Bengali descent
American Seventh-day Adventists
American musicians of Indian descent
American women musicians of Indian descent
Arista Records artists
Epic Records artists
Interscope Records artists
LaFace Records artists
Living people
Musicians from Columbus, Georgia
Participants in American reality television series
TLC (group) members